A list of British Basketball League seasons since inception of the league in 1987:

See also
British Basketball League
List of English National Basketball League seasons

External links
Official BBL website

 
B